KHTM-LD, VHF digital and virtual channel 13, is a low-powered FamilyNet/Church Channel-affiliated television station licensed to Lufkin, Texas, United States. Founded in 1986, the station is owned by the International Broadcasting Network.

External links

HTM-LD
Television channels and stations established in 1993
1993 establishments in Texas
Low-power television stations in the United States